This is an incomplete list of shopping centres in Sweden.

Blekinge County 
 Amiralen Shopping Centre, Karlskrona 
 Modehuset Kronan, Karlskrona 
 Slottsbacken Shopping Centre, Karlskrona 
 Wachtmeister Galleria, Karlskrona

Dalarna County 
 Falan Galleria, Falun
 Hjultorget Shopping Centre, Leksand
 Kupolen, Borlänge 
 Norra Backa, Borlänge

Gävleborg County 
 E-Center, Söderhamn
 Flanör, Gävle
 Gallerian Nian, Gävle
 Hemlingby Shopping Centre, Gävle
 Valbo Shopping Centre, Gävle

Halland County 
 Eurostop, Halmstad
 Flygstaden Shopping Centre, Halmstad
 Freeport Shopping Centre, Kungsbacka
 Gallerian, Varberg
 Gekås, Falkenberg
 Kungsmässan Shopping Centre, Kungsbacka

Jämtland County 
 Lillänge, Östersund
 Mittpunkten, Östersund

Jönköping County 
 Asecs, Jönköping
 Rosengallerian, Jönköping
 Sesamgallerian, Jönköping
 Solås Center, Jönköping

Kalmar County 
 Handelsområde Knekten, Hultsfred
 Baronen Shopping Centre, Kalmar
 Giraffen Shopping Centre, Kalmar
 Hansa City, Kalmar
 Kvasten Shopping Centre, Kalmar
 Ölands Köpstad, Färjestaden

Kronoberg County 
 Affärshuset Tegnér, Växjö
 Grand Samarkand, Växjö
 Handelsplats I11, Växjö
 Kosta Outlet, Lessebo
 Linnégallerian, Växjö

Norrbotten County 
 Ikano Retail Centre, Haparanda
 Shopping Galleria, Luleå
 Smedjan, Luleå
 Storheden Shopping Centre, Luleå

Skåne County

Malmö 
 Bulltofta Handelsområde
 Caroli
 Emporia (shopping mall)
 Entré, Malmö
 Hansagallerian
 Jägersro
 Mobilia, Malmö
 Rosengård Centrum
 Svågertorp
 Triangeln, Malmö

Other municipalities 
 Burlöv Shopping Centre, Burlöv
 Center Syd, Kävlinge
 Hyllinge Shopping Centre, Åstorp
 Lödde Centrum, Kävlinge
 Nova Lund, Lund
 Stora Bernstorp, Burlöv
 Söderpunkten, Helsingborg
 Väla Centrum, Helsingborg

Södermanland County 
 114 Factory Outlet, Vingåker
 21:an, Eskilstuna
 Cityhuset, Eskilstuna
 Folkesta Shopping Centre, Eskilstuna
 Gallerian, Eskilstuna, Eskilstuna
 Gumsbacken Shopping Centre, Nyköping
 Tuna Park, Eskilstuna

Stockholm County

Stockholm Municipality 
 Bromma Blocks
 Farsta Centrum
 Fältöversten
 Gallerian
 Globen Shopping
 Ringen Centrum
 Vällingby Centrum
 Kista Galleria
 Liljeholmstorget
 MOOD Stockholm
 Nordiska Kompaniet
 PUB
 Skrapan
 Skärholmen Centrum (SKHLM)
 Sturegallerian
 Västermalmsgallerian
 Westfield Mall of Scandinavia

South 
 Haninge Centrum, Handen
 Lidingö Centrum, Lidingö
 Nacka Forum, Nacka
 Sickla Köpkvarter, Nacka
 Tyresö Centrum, Tyresö

Huddinge 
 Heron City
 Huddinge Centrum
 Kungens Kurva
 Länna Shopping Centre

Södertälje 
 Kringlan, Södertälje
 Moraberg
 Weda Shopping Centre

North 
 Arninge Centrum, Täby
 Barkarby Shopping Centre, Jakobsberg
 Eurostop Arlandastad, Sigtuna
 Infracity, Upplands Väsby
 Sollentuna Centrum, Sollentuna
 Solna Centrum, Solna
 Stinsen Shoppingcenter, Häggvik
 Mall of Scandinavia, Solna
 Mörby Centrum, Danderyd
 Täby Centrum, Täby
 Veddesta Shopping Centre, Jakobsberg
 Väsby Centrum, Upplands Väsby
 Åkersberga Centrum, Österåker

Uppsala County 
 Bolandcity, Uppsala
 Bålsta Shopping Centre, Håbo
 Gottsunda Shopping Centre, Uppsala
 Gränby Centrum, Uppsala
 Forumgallerian, Uppsala
 St. Per Gallerian, Uppsala
 Stenhagen Centrum, Uppsala

Värmland County 
 Bergvik Shopping Centre, Karlstad
 Charlottenbergs Shoppingcenter, Charlottenberg
 Duvan, Karlstad
 Mitt i City, Karlstad
 Töcksfors Handelspark, Töcksfors
 Våxnäs Shopping Centre, Karlstad
 Välsvikens Handelsområde, Karlstad

Västerbotten County

Skellefteå 
 Citykompaniet
 Solbacken
 Galleria Vintergatan

Umeå 
 Avion Shopping
 Ersboda Shopping Centre
 MVG Umeå
 Strömpilen
 Utopia

Västernorrland County 
 Birsta city, Sundsvall
 Ingallerian, Sundsvall
 Oscarsgallerian, Örnsköldsvik
 Prima galleria, Sollefteå
 Citygallerian, Sollefteå

Västmanland County 
 Erikslund Shopping Center, Västerås
 Hälla Shopping, Västerås
 Punkt Gallerian, Västerås

Västra Götaland County

Gothenburg 
 Angered Shopping Centre
 Arkaden, Gothenburg
 Backaplan ShoppingCentre
 Bäckebol Homecenter
 Frölunda Torg
 Högsbo 421
 Kompassen
 Nordiska Kompaniet, Gothenburg
 Nordstan
 Sisjön Shopping Centre

Other municipalities 
 Allum Shopping Center, Partille
 Commerce Shopping Center, Skövde
 Knalleland, Borås
 Kållared Köpstad, Mölndal
 Nordby Shopping Center, Strömstad
 Torp Köpcentrum, Uddevalla
 Stenungs Torg, Stenungsund
 Överby Shopping Centre, Trollhättan

Örebro County 
 Krämaren, Örebro
 Marieberg Shopping Centre, Örebro
 Träffpunkt, Örebro

Östergötland County

Linköping 
 Filbytergallerian
 Gränden
 Leo Shopping Centre
 Tornby Shopping Centre

Norrköping 
 Galleria Domino
 Hageby Centrum
 Ingelsta Shopping Centre
 Linden Shopping Centre
 Spiralen Norrköping City

Mjölby 
 Depot Mantorp

References

Sweden
Shopping malls